DKW (Dampf-Kraft-Wagen, also Deutsche Kinder-Wagen . Das-Kleine-Wunder,  or Des-Knaben-Wunsch) was a German car- and motorcycle-marque.  DKW was one of the four companies that formed Auto Union in 1932 and thus became an ancestor of the modern-day Audi company.

In 1916, Danish engineer Jørgen Skafte Rasmussen founded a factory in Zschopau, Saxony, Germany, to produce steam fittings. That year he attempted to produce a steam-driven car, called the DKW. Although unsuccessful, he made a two-stroke toy engine in 1919, called Des Knaben Wunsch – "the boy's wish". He put a slightly modified version of this engine into a motorcycle and called it Das Kleine Wunder – "the little wonder" the initials from this becoming the DKW brand: by the late 1920s, DKW had become the world's largest motorcycle manufacturer.

In September 1924, DKW bought , saving them from Germany's hyperinflation economic crisis. Rudolf Slaby became chief-engineer at DKW.
In 1932, DKW merged with Audi, Horch and  Wanderer to form Auto Union. After World War II, DKW moved to West Germany. The original factory became MZ. Auto Union came under Daimler-Benz ownership in 1957 and was purchased by the Volkswagen Group in 1964. The last German-built DKW car was the  F102, which ceased production in 1966. Its successor, the four-stroke  F103, was marketed under the Audi brand, another Auto Union marque.

DKW-badged cars continued to be built under license in Brazil and Argentina until 1967 and 1969 respectively.  The DKW trademark is currently owned by Auto Union GmbH, a wholly-owned subsidiary of Audi AG which also owns the rights to other historical trademarks and intellectual property of the Auto Union combine.

Automobiles made between 1928 and 1942

DKW cars were made from 1928 until 1966, apart from the interruption caused by the Second World War. DKWs always used two-stroke engines, reflecting the company's position by the end of the 1920s as the world's largest producer of motorcycles. The first DKW car, the small and rather crude Typ P, emerged on 7 May 1928 and the model continued to be built at the company's Spandau (Berlin) plant, first as a roadster and later as a stylish if basic sports car, until 1931.

More significant was a series of inexpensive cars built 300 km (185 miles) to the south in Zwickau in the plant acquired by the company's owner in 1928 when he had become the majority owner in Audi Werke AG. Models F1 to F8 (F for Front) were built between 1931 and 1942, with successor models reappearing after the end of the war in 1945. They were the first volume production cars in Europe with front wheel drive, and were powered by transversely mounted two-cylinder two-stroke engines. These models had a generator that doubled as a starter, mounted directly on the crankshaft, known as a Dynastart. DKWs from Zwickau notched up approximately 218,000 units between 1931 and 1942. Most cars were sold on the home market and over 85% of DKWs produced in the 1930s were the little F series cars: DKW reached second place in German sales by 1934 and stayed there, accounting for 189,369 of the cars sold between 1931 and 1938, more than 16% of the market.

Between 1929 and 1940, DKW produced a less well remembered but technically intriguing series of rear-wheel drive cars called (among other names) Schwebeklasse and Sonderklasse with two-stroke V4 engines. Engine displacement was 1,000 cc, later 1,100 cc. The engines had two extra cylinders for forced induction, so they appeared like V6 engines but without spark plugs on the front cylinder pair.

In 1939, DKW made a prototype with the first three-cylinder engine, with a displacement of 900 cc and producing . It was put into production after World War II, first as an Industrieverband Fahrzeugbau (IFA) F9 (later Wartburg) in Zwickau, East Germany, and shortly afterwards in DKW-form from Düsseldorf as the 3=6 or F91.

DKW engines were used by Saab as a model for the Saab two-stroke in its Saab 92 car manufacturing venture, in 1947.

Automobiles made after 1945

As Auto Union was based in Saxony in what became the German Democratic Republic (East Germany), it took some time for it to regroup after the war. The company was registered in West Germany as Auto Union GmbH in 1949, first as a spare-part provider, but soon to take up production of the RT 125 motorcycle and a new delivery van, called a Schnellaster F800. Their first line of production took place in Düsseldorf. This van used the same engine as the last F8 made before the war.

Their first car was the F89 using the body from the prototype F9 made before the war and the two-cylinder two-stroke engine from the last F8. Production went on until it was replaced by the successful three-cylinder engine that came with the F91. The F91 was in production 1953–1955, and was replaced by the larger F93 in 1956. The F91 and F93 had 900 cc three-cylinder two-stroke engines, the first ones delivering , the last . The ignition system comprised three independent sets of points and coils, one for each cylinder, with the points mounted in a cluster around a single lobed cam at the front end of the crankshaft. The cooling system was of the free convection type assisted by a fan driven from a pulley mounted at the front end of the crankshaft.

The F93 was produced until 1959, and was replaced by the Auto-Union 1000. During this transition, production was moved from Düsseldorf to Ingolstadt, where Audi still has its production. From 1957, the cars could be fitted with a saxomat, an automatic clutch, the only small car then offering this feature. The last versions of the Auto-Union 1000S had disc brakes as option, an early development for this technology. A sporting 2+2 seater version was available as the Auto-Union 1000 SP from 1957 to 1964, the first years only as a coupé and from 1962 also as a convertible.

In 1956, the very rare DKW Monza was put into small-scale production on a private initiative, with a sporting two-seater body of glassfiber on a standard F93 frame. It was first called Solitude, but got its final name from the long-distance speed records it made on the Autodromo Nazionale Monza in Italy in November 1956. The number produced is said to be around 230 and production finished by the end of 1958.

A more successful range of cars was sold from 1959, the Junior/F12 series based on a modern concept from the late 1950s. The range consists of Junior (basic model) made from 1959 to 1961, Junior de Luxe (a little enhanced) from 1961 to 1963, F11 (a little larger) and F12 (larger and bigger engine) from 1963 to 1965, and F12 Roadster from 1964 to 1965. The Junior/F12 series became quite popular, and many cars were produced. An assembly plant was licensed in Ballincollig, County Cork, Ireland between 1952 and c.1964 and roughly 4,000 vehicles were assembled, ranging from saloons, vans and motorbikes to commercial combine harvesters. This was the only DKW factory outside Germany in Europe and for many years after its closure its large DKW sign could be visible on the wall of the factory.  The building was demolished in the late 2000s and was redeveloped into a German Aldi store and a McDonald's drive-thru.

All the three-cylinder two-stroke post-war cars had some sporting potential and formed the basis for many rally victories in the 1950s and early 1960s. This made DKW the most winning car brand in the European rally league for several years during the fifties.

In 1960, DKW developed a V6 engine by combining two three-cylinder two-stroke engines, with a capacity of 1,000 cc. The capacity was increased and the final V6 in 1966 had a capacity of 1,300 cc, which developed  at 5,000 rpm using the standard configuration with two carburettors. A four-carburettor version produced , a six-carburettor one . It weighed only . The V6 was planned to be used in the DKW Munga and the F102. About 100 engines were built for testing purposes and 13 DKW F102 and some Mungas were fitted with the V6 engine in the 1960s.

The last DKW was the F102, coming into production in 1964 as a replacement for the old-looking AU1000. However, the F102 sold poorly, largely due to its two-stroke engine technology which was at the limit of its development. Auto Union's parent, Daimler-Benz, decided to offload the company to Volkswagen. The car was re-engineered with a four-stroke engine and relaunched as the Audi F103. This marked the end of the DKW marque for cars, and the rebirth of the Audi name.

From 1956 to 1961, Dutch importer Hart, Nibbrig & Greve assembled cars in an abandoned asphalt factory in Sassenheim, where they employed about 120 workers, two transporter, that collected SKD kits from Duesseldorf and built about 13.500 cars. When the DKW plant moved the import of SKD kits stopped, as it became too expensive.

DKW in South America
From 1956 to 1967, DKW cars were made in Brazil by the local company Vemag (Veículos e Máquinas Agrícolas S.A., "Vehicles and Agricultural Machinery Inc."). Vemag was assembling Scania-Vabis trucks, but Scania Vabis became an independent company in July 1960. The original plans were to build the Candango off-roader (Munga), a utility vehicle and a four-door sedan, called Vemaguet and Belcar respectively. The first model built was the 900 cc F91 Universal but the Belcar and Vemaguet names were applied later.

In 1958, the F94 four-door sedan and station wagon were launched, in the early 1960s renamed Belcar and Vemaguet. The company also produced a luxury coupe (the DKW Fissore) and the off-road Munga (locally called Candango). In 1960 Vemag cars received the larger one-litre,  engine from the Auto Union 1000.

Vemag had a successful official racing team, with the coupe GT Malzoni, with fiberglass body. This project was the foundation of the long-lasting Brazilian sports car brand Puma. The Brazilian F94 line has been improved with several cosmetic changes and became more and more different from the German and Argentine models. Vemag had no capital to invest in new products and came under governmental pressure to merge. In 1964–1965 Volkswagen gradually took over Auto Union, a minority holder in Vemag, and in 1967 Volkswagen bought the remainder of the stock. VW quickly began phasing out DKW-Vemag production and introduced the Volkswagen 1600 sedan to the old Vemag plant, after a total of 109,343 DKW-Vemag cars had been built.

DKW vehicles were made in Argentina from 1960 to 1969 by IASF S.A. (Industria Automotriz Santa Fe Sociedad Anónima) in Sauce Viejo, Santa Fe. The most beautiful were the Cupé Fissore, which had many famous owners (Julio Sosa, César Luis Menotti, and others). Other models are the Auto Union 1000 S Sedán (21,797 made until 1969) and the Auto Union 1000 Universal S (6,396 made until 1969). and the Auto Union Combi/Pick-up.
The last version of the Auto Union Combi/Pick-up (DKW F1000 L), launched in 1969, survived a few months and was bought out by IME, which continued production until 1979.

Vans and utility vehicles

The DKW Munga was built by Auto Union in Ingolstadt. Production began in October 1956 and ended in December 1968, with 46,750 cars built.

From 1949 to 1962, DKW produced the Schnellaster with a trailing-arm rear suspension system with springs in the cross bar assembly. Spanish subsidiary IMOSA produced a modern successor introduced in 1963, the DKW F 1000 L. This van started with the three-cylinder 1,000 cc engine, but later received a Mercedes-Benz Diesel engine and was renamed a Mercedes-Benz in 1975.

Motorcycles

During the late 1920s and until WWII broke out, DKW was both the world's largest motorcycle manufacturer, as well as Europe's pioneer of front-wheel drive automobiles with their successful 1931 and later DKW Front models, before the 1932 Adler Trumpf and the 1934 Citroen Traction Avant. In 1931, Arnold Zoller started building split-singles and this concept made DKW the dominant racing motorcycle in the Lightweight and Junior classes between the wars. This included off-road events like the International Six Days Trial where the marque scored some considerable inter-war year successes alongside Bavarian Motor Works At the same time, the company also had some success with super-charged racing motorcycles which because of their light weight were particularly successful in the ISDT

The motorcycle branch produced famous models such as the RT 125 pre- and post-World War II, and after the war with production at the original factory in GDR becoming MZ it made 175, 250 and 350 (cc) models. As war reparations, the design drawings of the RT125 were given to Harley-Davidson in the US and BSA in the UK. The Harley-Davidson version was known loosely as the Hummer (Hummer is really just a few specific years, but generally people call the Harley lightweights Hummers), while BSA used them for the Bantam. IFA and later MZ models continued in production until the 1990s, when economics brought production of the two stroke to an end. Other manufacturers copied the DKW design, officially or otherwise. This can be seen in the similarity of many small two-stroke motorcycles from the 1950s, including from Yamaha, Voskhod, Maserati, and Polish WSK.

Cars

Pre-war production

 DKW Typ P (1928–1931) ~ 2,000 units
 DKW Typ 4=8 (1929–1940) ~ 24,000 units
 DKW F1 (1931–1932) ~ 4,000 units
 DKW F2 (1932–1935) ~ 17,000 units
 DKW F4 (1934–1935) ~ 7,000 units
 DKW F5 (1935–1937) ~ 60,000 units
 DKW F7 (1937–1938) ~ 80,000 units
 DKW F8 (1939–1942) ~ 50,000 units into the war.
 DKW F9 prototype (1939)
Pre-war and war-years production of civilian models totalled almost 250,000 units, of which some 218,000 were front-wheel driven.

Post-war

 DKW Schnellaster van (1949–1962)
 DKW F10 (1950)
 DKW F89 (1950–1954)
 DKW 3=6 (F91/F93/F94) (1953–1959)
 DKW Monza (1956–1958)
 DKW Munga off-road (1956–1968)
 DKW Junior (F11/F12) (1959–1965)
 DKW F102 (1963–1966)

Motorcycles and scooters

See also
 Eucort
 List of automobile manufacturers of Germany

Notes

References

 Siegfried Rauch Hrsg. von Frank Rönicke: DKW – Geschichte einer Weltmarke. Motorbuch-Verlag, Stuttgart 2007, .
 Thomas Erdmann: Vom Dampfkraftwagen zur Meisterklasse – Die Geschichte der DKW Automobile 1907–1945. autovision, Hamburg 2003, .
 Peter Kurze: DKW Meisterklasse – Ein Wagen für die ganze Welt. Delius Klasing, Bielefeld 2005, .
 
 
 
 Harald Linz, Halwart Schrader: Die Internationale Automobil-Enzyklopädie. United Soft Media Verlag, München 2008, .

External links

 UK-based official Wartburg, Trabant and IFA owners' club
 AUTO UNION Sales Brochures 1939
 DKW Owners' Club
 DKW Motorcycle Club
 Die Meisterdinger von Nürnberg – DKW webpages
 DKW & Auto Union History
 The Long History of Reverse-Cylinder Engine Designs – motocrossactionmag.com

 
Audi
Auto Union
Vehicle manufacturing companies established in 1916
Defunct motor vehicle manufacturers of Germany
Motorcycle manufacturers of Germany
Vehicle manufacturing companies disestablished in 1966
Volkswagen Group